Steven Shane Bonham (born October 18, 1970) is a former American football defensive tackle in the National Football League (NFL). He was drafted by the Detroit Lions in the third round of the 1994 NFL Draft. He played college football at Tennessee.

References

1970 births
Living people
American football defensive tackles
Tennessee Volunteers football players
Air Force Falcons football players
Detroit Lions players
San Francisco 49ers players
Indianapolis Colts players
Sportspeople from Fairbanks, Alaska
Players of American football from Alaska